Tafsir Gazur, also known as jalāʼ al-adhhān wa-jalāʼ al-aḥzān, is an exegesis on the Quran in Persian by Abul al-Mahasin Husayn Ibn Hasan Jurjani, from the 8th to 14th centuries. The book was originally named Jala' al-Adhhan wa Jala' al-Ahzan. "Gazur" comes from the author's name. According to Aqa Buzurg Tihrani, he was one of the Shi'i scholars of the 10th A.H. /16th century. Tafsir-i Gazur is sometimes referred to as "an abridged version of the exegetical work of Abu al-Futuh Razi" despite having no reference to the latter. According to Ibn Yusuf Shirazi, some sections of this book were collected by Jurjani but others were compiled by Sayyid Gazur. This view is rejected by Urmawi.

Significance 

Tafsir-i Gazur's importance in linguistics and literature is considered equivalent to that of Rawz al-jinan ve ruh al-jinan. Tafsir-i Gazur was used by Molla Fathollah Kashani as the primary source in writing Tafsir Menhaj Al-Sadeghin. Mir Jalal al-Din Muhaddith Urmawi was the first to publish Tafsir-i Gazur in ten volumes between 1337 and 1341, republished in 1958 and 1962.

References

External links 

 https://iqna.ir/fa/تفسير «گازر» دارای ارزش‌های دينی، اسلامی، مذهبی، مكتبی، ملی و فرهنگی است (in Persian)
 https://fa.wikishia.net/جلاء الاذهان و جلاء الاحزان (کتاب) (in Persian)

Shia tafsir